Sabah Tani (died 19 February 2018) was a Bangladeshi singer from the 1980s and 1990s. Her notable songs include "Kichhukhon", "Bhalobasa Bahurupi" and "Kono Baishakhi Raate Jodi".

Early life
Tani grew up in Karatia Union, Tangail.

Career
Tani served as a judge in the Sylhet region selection round of the reality show Close Up-1: Tomakei Khujchhey Bangladesh's 2012 edition. She had performed live music programs on television in 2016.

Personal life
Tani was the cousin of film actor Nayeem. She had one son, Anid. She died of low blood pressure. She was buried in Gorai village in Tangail.

References

1960s births
2018 deaths
20th-century Bangladeshi women singers
20th-century Bangladeshi singers
People from Tangail District
Place of birth missing
Date of birth missing